William Marshall Inge (1802–1846) was an American politician that represented Tennessee's tenth district in the United States House of Representatives in the 23rd Congress.

Biography
Inge was born in Granville County, North Carolina in 1802.  His parents were Richard Inge Sr., a Revolutionary War soldier, and Sally Johnson. He attended the schools of North Carolina, moved to Tennessee, and continued his schooling. He studied law, was admitted to the bar, and practiced law.

Career
William Marshall Inge's career included work as a lawyer, a Superior Court Judge, a state politician (in both Tennessee and Alabama), and a national politician.  He was a member of the Tennessee House of Representatives from 1828 - 1833.  He was then elected as a Jacksonian to the Twenty-third Congress, which lasted from March 4, 1833 to March 3, 1835. Having moved to Livingston, Alabama in 1836, Inge resumed the practice of his profession.

He was a member of the Alabama House of Representatives in 1840, 1844, and 1845. While a member of the Alabama House of Representatives, he argued against the death penalty.

Personal life

He married Susan Marr of Fayetteville, Tennessee.  They had six children: Sally, Mary Turner (she married John T. Loudon who served with an Arkansas Union Infantry regiment during the Civil War), Eliza Jane, John, Susan, and William, Jr. Inge.

Death
Inge died of heart disease in Livingston, Alabama in 1846 (age about 44 years) and is interred at Livingston Cemetery. He was the uncle of  U.S. Representative Samuel Williams Inge.

References

External links

1802 births
1846 deaths
Jacksonian members of the United States House of Representatives from Tennessee
19th-century American politicians